Ilex glabra, also known as Appalachian tea, dye-leaves, evergreen winterberry, gallberry, and inkberry, is a species of evergreen holly native to the coastal plain of eastern North America, from coastal Nova Scotia to Florida and west to Louisiana where it is most commonly found in sandy woods and peripheries of swamps and bogs. Ilex glabra is often found in landscapes of the middle and lower East Coast of the United States. It normally is cultivated as an evergreen shrub in USDA zones 6 to 10.

Gallberry nectar is the source of a pleasant honey that is popular in the southern United States.

Description

Spineless, flat, ovate to elliptic, glossy, dark green leaves (to 1.5 in long) have smooth margins with several marginal teeth near the apex. Leaves usually remain attractive bright green in winter unless temperatures fall below -17 C/0 F. Greenish white flowers (male in cymes and female in cymes or single) appear in spring, but are relatively inconspicuous. If pollinated, female flowers give way to pea-sized, jet black, berry-like drupes (inkberries to 3/8" diameter) which mature in early fall and persist throughout winter to early spring unless consumed by local bird populations. Cultivars of species plants (see for example Ilex glabra 'Shamrock') typically have better form (more compact, less open, less leggy and less suckering) that the species.

Uses

Honey
Gallberry honey is a highly rated honey that results from bees feeding on inkberry flowers. This honey is locally produced in certain parts of the Southeastern U. S. in areas where beekeepers release bees from late April to early June to coincide with inkberry flowering time.

Beverage
Dried and roasted inkberry leaves were first used by Native Americans to brew a black tea-like drink, hence the sometimes used common name of Appalachian tea for this shrub.

References

External links
Carolina Nature: Inkberry (Ilex glabra)
UConn Plant Database: Ilex glabra
NS Wildflora: Ilex glabra
Coastal Plain Plants: Ilex glabra

glabra
Flora of the Northeastern United States
Flora of the Southeastern United States
Flora of Eastern Canada
Flora of the Appalachian Mountains
Garden plants of North America
Native American ethnobotany
Flora without expected TNC conservation status